The Workshop on Geometric Methods in Physics (WGMP) is a conference on mathematical physics focusing on geometric methods in physics . It is organized each year since 1982 in the village of Białowieża, Poland. It is organized by the Chair of Mathematical Physics of Faculty of Mathematics, University of Białystok. Its founder and main organizer is Anatol Odzijewicz.

WGMP takes place in its home venue, in the heart of the Białowieża National Park. A number of social events, including campfire, an excursion to the Białowieża forest and a banquet, are usually organized during the week.

Notable participants
In the past, Workshops were attended by scientists including:  Roy Glauber, Francesco Calogero, Ludvig Faddeev, Martin Kruskal, :es:Bogdan Mielnik, Emma Previato, Stanisław Lech Woronowicz, Vladimir E. Zakharov, Dmitry Anosov, :de:Gérard Emch, George Mackey, :fr:Moshé Flato, Daniel Sternheimer, Tudor Ratiu, Simon Gindikin, Boris Fedosov, :pl:Iwo Białynicki-Birula, Jędrzej Śniatycki, Askolʹd Perelomov, Alexander Belavin, Yvette Kosmann-Schwarzbach, :pl:Krzysztof Maurin, Mikhail Shubin, Kirill Mackenzie.

Special sessions
Many times special sessions were scheduled within the programme of the Workshop. In the year 2016 there was a session "Integrability and Geometry" financed by National Science Foundation. In the year 2017 there was a session dedicated to the memory and scientific achievements of S. Twareque Ali, long time participant and co-organizer of the Workshop. In the year 2018 there was a session dedicated to scientific achievements of prof. Daniel Sternheimer on the occasion of his 80th birthday. In the previous years, there were sessions dedicated to other prominent mathematicians and physicists such as S.L. Woronowicz, G. Emch, B. Mielnik, F. Berezin.

School on Geometry and Physics
Since 2012 the Workshop is accompanied by a School on Geometry and Physics, which is targeted at young researchers and graduate students. During the School several courses by leading experts in mathematical physics take place.

Proceedings
Starting at 1992, after the Workshop a volume of proceedings is published. In the recent years it was published in the series Trends in Mathematics by Birkhäuser. In 2005 a commemorative tome Twenty Years of Bialowieza: A Mathematical Anthology. Aspects of Differential Geometric Methods in Physics was published by World Scientific.

References

Further reading

External links
 Conference webpage
 

Mathematics conferences
Physics conferences
Recurring events established in 1982
University of Białystok
Mathematical physics